Fazeela Amir (16 December 1969) is a Maldivian singer.

Early life
Fazeela Amir was born and raised in the "Amir family" where several artists including Ahmed Amir and Ibrahim Amir were brought up and "ruled" the music industry. She made her career debut with the album Hiyy Fahi where she lent her voice for eleven songs in the album. This resulted in her receiving several offers from music directors and producers to sing for their films and albums before making her breakthrough with her "high-pitched" rendition of the songs in the 1994 released film Dheriyaa. Her duets with Ali Rameez are well noted in the industry and maximum duets with Rameez are recorded by Amir. In 1998, the Government of Maldives honoured her with the National Award of Recognition. She remained as one of the most commercially successful and popular local artists till 2004, where the local scene of studio albums continued to trend downward. At the 3rd Gaumee Film Awards ceremony, Amir was bestowed as the Best Female Playback Singer for her vocal performance in the song "Mihitha Loabi Dheynan" from Amaanaaiy (1998). In 2018, Air was ranked fourth in the list of the "Most Desired Comeback Voices", compiled by Dho?.

Discography

Feature film

Short films

Television

Non-film songs

Accolades

References 

Living people
People from Malé
1969 births
Maldivian playback singers